Anna Maria Marasi  (born ) was an Italian volleyball player. She was part of the Italy women's national volleyball team

She participated in the 1994 FIVB Volleyball Women's World Championship. At club level she played with Latte Rugiada Matera.

Clubs
 Latte Rugiada Matera (1994)

References

1969 births
Living people
Italian women's volleyball players
Place of birth missing (living people)